Majestic Building, also known as the Indiana Farm Bureau Co-op Building, is a historic commercial building located at Indianapolis, Indiana.  It was built in 1895–1896, and is a large ten-story, "U"-shaped, brick and limestone building.  It features semi-circular and voussoir arched openings.

Citizens Gas & Coke Utility leased four floors for its headquarters until 1956.

It was listed on the National Register of Historic Places in 1980.

References

Commercial buildings on the National Register of Historic Places in Indiana
Commercial buildings completed in 1896
Commercial buildings in Indianapolis
National Register of Historic Places in Indianapolis